Cordagalmatidae is a family of cnidarians belonging to the order Siphonophorae.

Genera:
 Cardianecta Pugh, 2016
 Cordagalma Totton, 1932

References

Physonectae
Cnidarian families